Luge at the 1984 Winter Olympics consisted of three events at Sarajevo Olympic Bobsleigh and Luge Track.  The competition took place between 9 and 12 February 1984.

Medal summary

Medal table

East Germany led the medal table with four medals, one gold.

Events

Participating NOCs
Seventeen nations participated in Luge at the Sarajevo Games. Puerto Rico and Yugoslavia made their Olympic luge debuts.

References

 
1984
1984 Winter Olympics events
1984 in luge